The Democratic Unionist Party (Arabic: حزب الاتحاد الديمقراطي‎, romanized: Hizb al-Itahadi al-democrati) is an Egyptian political party, with a membership of around 215 members. The party presses for achieving unity between Egypt and Sudan and separation between church and state.

The party nominated its head, Ibrahim Tork, to run for Egypt's first contested presidential elections.

Platform 
The party platform calls for:
 Guaranteeing citizens' basic freedoms and political rights.
 Achieving comprehensive economic development.
 Upgrading public utilities and services.
 Protecting Egypt's status on regional and international arenas.

References

External links
Political Parties

1990 establishments in Egypt
Liberal parties in Egypt
Political parties established in 1990
Secularism in Egypt